Mār Qardāgh, was a legendary Assyrian prince who was martyred for converting to Christianity.

Life 

Qardāgh was born to a noble family in the Sassanid Empire during the 4th century and descended from the "great race and lineage of the kingdom of the Assyrians". When Qardāgh was 25 years old, Shapur II visited his parents’ estate and was impressed with Qardāgh's handsome appearance and athleticism. Qardāgh was appointed as a governor for a large region in northern Persia, there he met Abdisho and converted to Christianity.

Upon returning home Qardāgh was rejected by his family and under pressure from the religious elite, Shapur sentenced him to be stoned. Qardāgh fled with a small army to the mountains where he was able to repel the Persians for months. One night Saint Stephen appeared to him and told him that it was better to give his life for his faith than to continue fighting. He surrendered to the king and it was his own father who threw the first stone.

He was buried in Arbil, Adiabene where a church holding his relics was later constructed.

See also 
Mar Behnam

References

Sources

4th-century Christian martyrs
Year of birth unknown
Christians in the Sasanian Empire
Assyrian Church of the East saints
Converts to Christianity from Zoroastrianism